Transportes Charter do Brasil (TCB) was a cargo airline based in São Paulo, Brazil. It was established in 1994 and operated charter cargo services throughout the Americas until 2006. Its main base was Viracopos International Airport, São Paulo.

Former fleet
1 Douglas DC-8-52 - still abandoned at Manaus Airport
1 Douglas DC-8-54JT

See also
List of defunct airlines of Brazil

References

Defunct airlines of Brazil
Airlines established in 1994
Airlines disestablished in 2006
Cargo airlines
1994 establishments in Brazil
2006 disestablishments in Brazil